9G or 9-G can refer to:

IATA code for Perm Airlines
IATA code for Galaxy Airways; see List of defunct airlines of Europe
New York State Route 9G
Jo in Nine G Hell, debut album by The Hair and Skin Trading Company
HP 9g, a Hewlett-Packard graphing calculator
9G-MKJ; see MK Airlines Flight 1602
Z-9g, a model of Harbin Z-9
SSH 9G (WA); see  List of former state highways in Washington

See also
G9 (disambiguation)